The organized system of Wisconsin State Trunk Highways (typically abbreviated as STH or WIS), the state highway system for the U.S. state of Wisconsin, was created in 1917. The legislation made Wisconsin the first state to have a standard numbering system for its highways. It was designed to connect every county seat and city with over 5000 residents. The original system numbered the roads starting at 11 and ran up to 199. The 1917 law required the creation of a distinctive state route marker, which was initially an inverted triangle. "...it soon became apparent that (the triangle) served no really useful purpose after the public had become educated to the idea of the numbering. The long vertical axis made it necessary to use a lot of space, much of which was useless." Distinctive route markers were eventually redesigned to use a rounded rectangle for better space usage, but the inverted triangle remains transposed, as a vestige.

These routes were altered significantly in 1926 when United States Numbered Highways were commissioned. It was altered to include communities with at least 2,500 residents. Further alteration occurred when the Interstate Highway System was commissioned in the state. 



Mainline highways

Special routes
Except where indicated, the following highways are or were locally maintained.

See also

References

External links
Wisconsin Highways Website

State
 List